In the Heat of the Night is the second album by British soul/dance group Imagination, produced by Steve Jolley and Tony Swain and released in 1982.

Release and singles 
In the Heat of the Night was Imagination's most successful album, reaching No. 7 in the United Kingdom.  "Just an Illusion" was the group's highest charting single, peaking at No. 2 (kept off the top spot by the Goombay Dance Band's "Seven Tears"), and also making the top 10 in several other countries in Western Europe and Scandinavia. It was covered by Destiny's Child on their self-titled album and Mariah Carey sampled this song for her hit "Get Your Number" in her 2005 album The Emancipation of Mimi.  "Music and Lights" was another UK top 5 hit, and "In the Heat of the Night" and "Changes" also charted.

Track listing
All tracks composed by Steve Jolley, Tony Swain, Leee John and Ashley Ingram.

 "In the Heat of the Night" – 5:14  
 "Heart 'N Soul" –  4:45  
 "Music and Lights" –  5:21  
 "All Night Loving"  – 4:18  
 "Just an Illusion"  – 6:27  
 "All I Want to Know"  – 4:48  
 "One More Love"  – 5:18  
 "Changes" –  5:47

Personnel 
Technical

 Tony Swain – engineer, producer, arrangement
 Steve Jolley – engineer, producer, arrangement
 Richard Lengyel – engineer
 Gordon Milne – additional engineer
 Dave Ford – additional engineer
 Brad Davis – additional engineer
 Roland Harris – additional engineer
 Austin Ince – additional engineer
 Tony Bridge – cutting engineer
 Dave Rose – cover concept, design, illustration
 Leee John – cover concept
 Brian Longley – cover concept
 Carl Marx – photography
 Howard Saunders – typography

Charts

Weekly charts

Year-end charts

Certifications

References

Imagination (band) albums
1982 albums
RCA Records albums
Albums produced by Jolley & Swain